Orange Pavilion is a multi-purpose arena on the grounds of the NOS Events Center in San Bernardino, California. It seats 5,000 spectators and is best known for hosting the National Orange Show Festival.

It was home to the San Bernardino Bucking Bulls, of the NIFL.

The arena played host to the Tattoo the Earth Tour on August 12, 2000. The show featured performances by Slipknot, Slayer, Sevendust, Sepultura, Hed PE, Mudvayne, downset., Hatebreed, Full Devil Jacket, Famous, Amen, U.P.O., Nothingface, Professional Murder Music, Relative Ash, Systematic, and Nashville Pussy. It also featured 42 tattoo artists from Australia, Austria, France, Germany, Malaysia, Manitoba, Spain, Switzerland and the US.

On December 15, 1990, Westwood One recorded a concert by Bad Company that would later be featured on the Superstar Concert Series program.

On April 1, 1996 the arena hosted four tapings of WWE Raw, which aired on April 1, 8, 15 and 22.

External links
Description

Indoor arenas in California
Sports venues in San Bernardino, California